Thomas Hayden was an Irish Labour Party politician. An agricultural labourer, he was elected to the 4th Seanad Éireann in 1943 by the Labour Panel, and was re-elected at the 1944 Seanad election. He did not contest the 1948 election. He was an unsuccessful Labour Party candidate for the Carlow–Kildare constituency at the 1943 and 1944 general elections, and also unsuccessfully contested the Carlow–Kilkenny constituency at the 1951 general election.

References

Year of birth missing
Year of death missing
Labour Party (Ireland) senators
Members of the 4th Seanad
Members of the 5th Seanad